Telling the World is a surviving 1928 American comedy silent film directed by Sam Wood and written by Joseph Farnham and Raymond L. Schrock. The film stars William Haines, Anita Page, Eileen Percy, Frank Currier, and Polly Moran. The film was released on June 30, 1928, by Metro-Goldwyn-Mayer.

Cast 
William Haines as Don Davis
Anita Page as Chrystal Malone
Eileen Percy as Maizie
Frank Currier as Mr. Davis
Polly Moran as Landlady
Bert Roach as Lane
William V. Mong as City Editor
Matthew Betz as The Killer

Preservation status
This film is preserved and held by the British Film Institute, National Film and Television Archive.

References

External links 
 

1928 films
1920s English-language films
Silent American comedy films
1928 comedy films
Metro-Goldwyn-Mayer films
Films directed by Sam Wood
American black-and-white films
American silent feature films
Surviving American silent films
1920s American films